Coaster is a 1993 video game developed by American studio Code To Go and published by Walt Disney Computer Software for DOS.

Gameplay
Coaster is a simulator which allows players to build rollercoasters. The player can ride pre-made or custom coasters and design new coasters from scratch or existing coasters. After each ride of the coaster, the player is presented with a score. The score is given based on the judgments of six evaluators. Each evaluator has a separate, distinct criterion, which determines score of the coaster. The player can fulfill criteria, leading to a higher score, by designing the coaster towards to the evaluators' specific needs. The player can also look the ride statistics by reviewing the "signature".

Reception
In 1996, Computer Gaming World declared Coaster the 31st-worst computer game ever released.

Reviews
 Top Secret - February 1994
 Computer Gaming World (March 1994)

References

External links
Coaster (1993) at MobyGames
Coaster (1993) can be played in browser at the Internet Archive

1993 video games
DOS games
DOS-only games
First-person video games
Roller coaster games and simulations
Video games developed in the United States